Full Moon is a duet album by Kris Kristofferson and Rita Coolidge, released in September 1973 on A&M Records.  It is the first of three duet albums by the couple, who married weeks before the album's release, and arguably the best.  Unlike Kristofferson solo albums, it features several covers.

The album was only ever reissued once, on CD in Japan, until an expanded edition was released by Real Gone Music on June 2, 2017.

Background
Only weeks before Full Moons release, Kristofferson and Coolidge got married.  Coolidge had contributed vocals to Kristofferson's previous two albums, including two duets on Jesus Was a Capricorn.  At the time Kristofferson was the bigger star, having just topped the country charts with the gospel song "Why Me," and topped the country album charts with its parent album Jesus Was a Capricorn.   Coolidge's previous release, 1972's The Lady's Not for Sale, reached number 43 on the U.S. pop charts. (The title track of the album was co-written by Kristofferson.)  In 2016 Krisofferson spoke about the album to Uncuts Graeme Thomson:

Since they were on different record labels, Monument and A&M came to an agreement to take turns releasing the album, with Coolidge’s A&M going first with Full Moon.

Recording and composition
Full Moon was produced by Coolidge's producer David Anderle. As noted by William Ruhlmann in his AllMusic review of the album, "Despite Kristofferson's greater celebrity, the LP was made with Coolidge's strengths in mind. David Anderle, its producer, was her producer, and it was released on her record label, A&M. The songs were set in her key, with Kristofferson crooning along in an unusually high register. The tempos were mostly slow, emphasizing the dreamy quality of Coolidge's voice."  The pair co-wrote two songs for the LP, which was, unsurprisingly, made up of mostly love songs.  Although Kristofferson was the hottest writer in country music in the early seventies, Full Moon contains material from other writers, including Kristofferson keyboardist Donnie Fritts, Tony Joe White, Larry Murray, and Tom Jans.  The album was a departure musically for Kristofferson, whose albums became more polished since his debut, and this trend continued with Full Moon, as noted by biographer Stephen Miller:

The couple would release two more duet albums in 1974 and 1978.

Reception
Buoyed by the news of their wedding and the Caribbean-flavored single "A Song I'd Like to Sing" reaching the U.S. Top 40 pop chart, as well as the country and easy listening charts, Full Moon became a number one country album. "From the Bottle to the Bottom" won the Grammy Award for Best Country Vocal Performance by a Duo or Group in 1974.

Track listing 
 "Hard to Be Friends" (Larry Murray) – 3:25
 "It's All Over (All Over Again)" (Coolidge, Kristofferson) – 2:45
 "I Never Had It So Good" (Roger Nichols, Paul Williams) – 4:08
 "From the Bottle to the Bottom" (Kristofferson) – 4:06
 "Take Time to Love" (Donnie Fritts, Tony Joe White) – 2:55
 "Tennessee Blues" (Bobby Charles) – 5:20
 "Part of Your Life" (Allan Rich, Margaret Ann Rich) – 3:09
 "I'm Down (But I Keep Falling)" (Coolidge, Kristofferson) – 3:08
 "I Heard the Bluebirds Sing" (Hod Pharis) – 2:48
 "After the Fact" (Stephen Bruton) – 5:05
 "Loving Arms" (Tom Jans) – 3:50
 "A Song I'd Like to Sing" (Kristofferson) – 4:00

Personnel
Kris Kristofferson, Rita Coolidge – all vocals
Michael Utley – keyboards
Sammy Creason – drums
Donnie Fritts – keyboards
Stephen Bruton – guitar
Terry Paul – bass
Leland Sklar – bass
Jerry McGee – guitar, harmonica
Bobbye Hall – percussion
David Bromberg – guitar
Nick DeCaro – accordion
David Smith – musician
Gary Scruggs – bass guitar, harmonica
Randy Scruggs – guitar
Vassar Clements – fiddle
Josh Graves – dobro
Booker T. Jones – keyboards
Herb Alpert – trumpet
Strings arranged by David Campbell and Norman Kurban & performed by the Campbell-Kurban String Section

Production
Produced by David Anderle
Recorded at Sunset Sound Studios, Los Angeles, California
Recording engineer: John Haeny
Mixing engineer: David Anderle
Mixing assistant: Rick Tarantini
Mastered at Mastering Lab, by Doug Sax
Art direction by Roland Young
Album design by Paula Bard
All photos by Bob Jenkins

Charts

Certifications and sales

References

1973 albums
Kris Kristofferson albums
Rita Coolidge albums
Albums arranged by David Campbell (composer)
Albums produced by David Anderle
Albums recorded at Sunset Sound Recorders
A&M Records albums
Vocal duet albums